Association Sportive de Valentigney is a French football club located in Valentigney, France.

History 
AS Valentigney was founded in 1920, in Valentigney, France. An amateur club for most of their existence, they made it to the 1926 Coupe de France Final, where they lost 4–1 to Olympique de Marseille. Privately managed by Peugeot, Valentigney's early successes inspired the Peugeot management team to create FC Sochaux-Montbéliard in 1928. From 1942 to 1944 during World War II, Sochaux and Valentigney briefly merged to create FC Sochaux Valentigney, but thereafter separated and ran independently again.

Colours and badge 
AS Valentigney's colors are red and white.

Honours
 Coupe de France
 Runners-up: 1925-1926
Championnat de France Amateur
 Winners: 1935-36

References

External links 
 AS Valentigney Official website
 FFF Profile
 Stat Football Club Profile

Association football clubs established in 1920
Sport in Doubs
1920 establishments in France
Football clubs in Bourgogne-Franche-Comté